Austinville is a former town and now a neighborhood within the city of Decatur in Morgan County, Alabama, United States. It is about 3 miles south from downtown Decatur, centered on the junction of Danville Road and Carridale Street. It was incorporated as a town in 1907 and disincorporated and annexed into the city of Decatur in 1956.

Geography

Demographics

Town of Austinville

Austinville first appeared on the 1910 U.S. Census three years after it incorporated. It was annexed into Decatur in 1956. See also Austinville precinct below.

Historic demographics

Austinville Precinct/Division (1910-20; 1960)

Austinville Precinct (Morgan County 23rd Precinct) was created and first appeared on the 1910 U.S. Census. In 1927, it and the Albany 19th precinct were annexed into the Decatur 1st precinct. In 1960, the Austinville name was attached to a newly-created census division, and included the towns of Flint City and Trinity. The division was merged into the Decatur Census Division by 1970.

References

Notes

References

Former municipalities in Alabama